Andrew Taylor Weir (born June 16, 1972) is an American novelist and former computer programmer. His 2011 novel The Martian was adapted into the 2015 film of the same name directed by Ridley Scott. He received the John W. Campbell Award for Best New Writer in 2016 and his 2021 novel Project Hail Mary was a finalist for the 2022 Hugo Award for Best Novel.

Early life
Weir was raised in Milpitas, California. His father, John Weir, was a physicist at Sandia National Laboratories, and his mother was an electrical engineer. He was an only child, and his parents divorced when he was eight. Weir grew up reading classic science fiction such as the works of Arthur C. Clarke and Isaac Asimov. At the age of 15, he began working as a computer programmer for Sandia.

After high school, Weir studied computer science at the University of California, San Diego, though he did not graduate. He worked as a programmer for several software companies, including AOL, Palm, MobileIron, and Blizzard, where he worked on the video game Warcraft II: Tides of Darkness.

Writing
Weir began writing science fiction in his twenties and published work on his website for years. He authored a humor web comic, Casey and Andy, featuring fictionalized "mad scientist" versions of himself and his friends (such as writer Jennifer Brozek) from 2001 to 2008. He also briefly worked on another comic, Cheshire Crossing (bridging Alice in Wonderland, Peter Pan, The Wizard of Oz and Mary Poppins) from 2006 to 2008. The attention these gained him has been attributed as later helping launch his writing career, following his failure to publish his first novel attempt, Theft of Pride. His first work to gain significant attention was "The Egg", a 2009 short story that has been adapted into a number of YouTube videos, a one-act play, and is the overarching concept of Everybody, the third album by American rapper Logic.

Weir wrote his first published novel, The Martian, to be as scientifically accurate as possible, doing extensive research into orbital mechanics, conditions on the planet Mars, the history of human spaceflight, and botany. Originally published as a free serial on his website, some readers requested he make it available on Amazon Kindle. First sold for 99 cents, the novel made it to the Kindle bestsellers list. Weir was then approached by a literary agent and sold the rights to Crown Publishing Group. The print version (slightly edited from the original) debuted at No. 12 on The New York Times bestseller list in 2014. The Wall Street Journal called it "the best pure sci-fi novel in years". It was adapted into a film starring Matt Damon and Jessica Chastain, which was released in 2015.
 
In 2015 Weir announced he was working on his second novel, provisionally titled Zhek, which he described as "a more traditional sci-fi novel with aliens, telepathy, faster-than-light travel, etc." A fan-fiction story written by Weir, "Lacero", was published in the 2016 edition of Ready Player One, making it canonical to the book's fictional universe. The work functions as a prequel to the main novel. Also in 2016, Weir released The Principles of Uncertainty, a collection of short stories, on the website/app Tapas.

After announcing that the Zhek project had been "back-burnered", Weir moved on to another hard sci-fi novel, Artemis, with a female protagonist, set on the Moon in the 2080s–2090s. The thriller, published in 2017, follows Jazz, a 26-year-old woman constrained by her small town (which is also the only city on the Moon). On September 26, 2017, it was announced that Phil Lord and Christopher Miller had been hired to develop and direct a film based on the novel.

In 2017 CBS picked up a pilot written by Weir titled Mission Control, following a group of young NASA astronauts and scientists. In May of that year, Weir collaborated with webcomic artist Sarah Andersen to reillustrate Cheshire Crossing for Tapas, before publishing it as a stand-alone graphic novel in July 2019. In November 2019, a film adaptation was announced from Amblin Partners and Walt Disney Pictures, to be produced by Michael De Luca and written by Erin Cressida Wilson.

In May 2021, Weir's third novel, Project Hail Mary, was released. It revolves around an astronaut, Ryland Grace, who wakes up from a coma on a strange spacecraft, afflicted with amnesia. It has received widespread positive reviews, winning the 2022 Audie Award for Audiobook of the Year and a nomination for the 2022 Hugo Awards for Best Novel, as well as achieving the #1 spot on the New York Times  Audiobook Bestseller List. Ryan Gosling is slated to produce and star as Grace in a film adaption, with Lord and Miller directing the project.

Personal life
According to Weir, he grew up in Milpitas, California, where he attended Rancho Milpitas Junior High School and Milpitas High School.

In 2015, he lived in Mountain View, California, in a rented two-bedroom apartment. Since he has a fear of flying, he never visited the set of the film adaptation of The Martian in Budapest, where most of the scenes set on Mars were shot at Korda Studios. In 2015, with the help of therapy and medication, he was able to fly to Houston to visit the Johnson Space Center, and to San Diego to attend Comic-Con.

Weir is married to Ashley Weir, whom he met while he was in Los Angeles to pitch a TV series. They have one son, born in 2021. Weir has said that he is agnostic, and has described his political views as fiscally conservative and socially liberal.

Works
Weir's original website lists his works, with free versions of many of his short stories.

Novels
 Theft of Pride (web version 2000)
 The Martian (web version 2011; Random House 2014) 
 Artemis (Random House 2017) 
 Project Hail Mary (Random House 2021)

Serial novels and long stories 
Detectives (1986)
Bonnie MacKenzie: The Life Story of a Mermaid (an on-going story)
Moriarty (Holmesian fanfiction)
The Romana Chronicles/The Xoloans (Doctor Who fanfiction)
Randomize (Amazon Original Stories: Forward collection)

Short stories 
 Principles of Uncertainty (collection of flash fiction, Tapas e-book 2016). Includes the following stories:
 "Access"
 "Annie's Day"
 "Antihypoxiant"
 "Meeting Sarah"
 "The Midtown Butcher"
 "The Chef"
 "The Egg" (short story/audiobook) 2009
 "The Real Deal"
 "Yuri Gagarin Saves the Galaxy"
 "Bored World"
 "Twarrior"
 "Rat"
 "Lacero", prequel to Ready Player One (Ernest Cline, ed.), Subterranean Press 2016
 "Diary of an AssCan" (2015), tie-in prequel to "The Martian"

Comics and graphic novels 
 Casey and Andy (2001–2008), a webcomic written and drawn by Weir
 Cheshire Crossing (independent web version 2006–2008 with art by Weir; Tapas web version 2017–2019 and Random House 2019 with art by Sarah Andersen)

Audio
 James Moriarty, Consulting Criminal (Audible Studios 2017)
 The Egg and Other Stories (Audible Studios 2017)
 Hail Mary with narration by Ray Porter (Audible Studios 2021)

Sourcebooks
 GURPS Casey and Andy (artwork by Weir; written by David Morgan-Mar based on Weir's webcomic; Steve Jackson Games 2005)

Other works
 Der Mars Survival Guide , an interview with Weir and his tips for surviving on Mars, published as a booklet

Notes

References

External links

 
 Original site with the Creative Works of Andy Weir
 Science & Film interview with Weir about The Martian
 
 

1972 births
Living people
People from Davis, California
American science fiction writers
American male novelists
21st-century American novelists
American agnostics
John W. Campbell Award for Best New Writer winners
Sandia National Laboratories people
21st-century American male writers
Novelists from California
Andy Weir